Cecil King may refer to:

 Cecil Frederick King (1899–1919), World War I flying ace
 Cecil Harmsworth King (1901–1987), chairman of Mirror Group Newspapers, and later a director at the Bank of England
 Cecil King (British painter) (1881–1942), British painter
 Cecil King (Irish painter) (1921–1986), Irish abstract-minimalist painter
 Cecil King (rugby league), rugby league footballer of the 1910s for New Zealand, Wellington, and Taranaki
 Cecil R. King (1898–1974), congressman from California